Alan H. Borning is an American Computer Scientist noted for his research on human computer interaction and object-oriented programming. In particular his research in human-computer interaction is on designing for human values. He works on systems to support civic engagement and deliberation, and works on tools to make public transportation easier to use. He has also worked on constraint-based languages and systems, and  cooperating constraint languages and solvers.

Biography
Borning  received a B.A. in Mathematics from Reed College in 1971. He received a M.S. in Computer Science from Stanford University in 1974 and a Ph.D in Computer Science from  Stanford University in 1979.

He then joined the Department of Computer Science at the University of Washington in 1980, where in 2016 he is still a professor there. He is also an adjunct professor in the Information School, and a member of the Interdisciplinary Ph.D. Program in Urban Design and Planning.

Awards
In the year 2001, he became an ACM Fellow for contributions to constraint-based languages, systems, and applications, to object-oriented programming; and to understanding issues of computers and society.

References

External links
 University of Washington: Alan H. Borning, Department of Computer Science

American computer scientists
University of Washington faculty
Fellows of the Association for Computing Machinery
Living people
1950 births
Reed College alumni
Stanford University alumni
Place of birth missing (living people)